The Far Meridian is a podcast following the protagonist Peri, who wakes one day to find that her home, a lighthouse, has moved. It is written and created by Eli Barraza and is the second podcast produced by the Whisperforge podcast collective, which has also produced ars Paradoxia, StarTripper!!, Caravan, Remarkable Provinces, and Brimstone Valley Mall. The podcast is directed by Eli Barraza, Danielle Shemaiah, and Mischa Stanton, and the sound design is by Mischa Stanton. The opening and closing theme is "Window" by The Album Leaf. The genre has been described as both magical realism and "hopepunk".

Content

Synopsis
The Far Meridian is a series of vignettes following Peri, short for Hesperia, as she adjusts to her lighthouse disappearing every sunset and reappearing in a new location at sunrise. The podcast is episodic, with Peri visiting new locations and meeting new people as she searches for her missing brother, Ace.

Characters

 Hesperia (Peri) – voiced by Eli Barraza
 Horace (Ace) – voiced by Noah Gildermaster
 Ruth – voiced by Danielle Shemaiah
 Benicio (Benny) – José Donado
 The Tattered Woman – Lily Richards

Accolades

The Audioverse Awards

References

External links 

 Official Website

2017 podcast debuts
Magic realism
Patreon creators
Audio podcasts
Scripted podcasts